The Chicago Electrical Trauma Rehabilitation Institute (CETRI), located in Chicago, Illinois, was founded in 2009 by a group of scientists and physicians that had collaborated for more than 20 years to better understand and treat electrical injury patients. These collaborators were members of the faculty of four major medical centers in Chicago. Over the years, this multi-institution research team have published more than 120 scientific articles and three textbooks on the topic of electrical injury and have evaluated many electrical shock survivors. Some important discoveries made by this team are that electrical shock injury is mediated by multiple mechanisms including non-thermal electrical forces, which many electrical shock survivors develop neuropsychological problems even if the current never passed through the brain and progressive peripheral pain and sleeplessness often adds to the disability.  However, some electrical shock survivors do not manifest these problems.

Mission and history

CETRI's mission is to promote recovery of individuals affected by electric injury while simultaneously advancing the understanding of tissue injury patterns associated with electric shock injuries. Its scientists and clinicians evaluate electrical shock survivors, then communicate with the medical providers in the patients community to optimize rehabilitation.  Electrical shock injury is a complex multi-physical trauma that results in a range of clinical manifestations that differ from patient to patient. The explanation for this is one of CETRI's priority research focus areas. CETRI's research is funded by a both federal, private research agencies as well as public foundations. CETRI's publications are highly referenced in the scientific community and by trade magazines .

Affiliated universities
 University of Illinois at Chicago
 The University of Chicago

See also 
 Electrical shock
 Burn
 Electrocution
 Research

External links
 
 Researchers examine neuropathological mechanism mediating electrical injury
 Industrial Electrical Shock statistics
 First Aide for Electrical Shock Victims

2009 establishments in Illinois
Healthcare in Chicago